There are sixty-two mammal species in Armenia, of which one is critically endangered, two are endangered, eight are vulnerable, and four are near threatened.

The following tags are used to highlight each species' conservation status as assessed by the International Union for Conservation of Nature:

Order: Artiodactyla (even-toed ungulates) 

The even-toed ungulates are ungulates whose weight is borne about equally by the third and fourth toes, rather than mostly or entirely by the third as in perissodactyls. There are about 220 artiodactyl species, including many that are of great economic importance to humans.
Family: Bovidae (cattle, antelope, sheep, goats)
Subfamily: Caprinae
Genus: Capra
Wild goat, C. aegagrus 
Genus: Ovis
 Mouflon, O. gmelini 
 Armenian mouflon, O. g. gmelini
Genus: Rupicapra
Chamois, R. rupicapra 
Family: Cervidae (deer)
Subfamily: Cervinae
Genus: Axis
Chital, A. axis  introduced
Genus: Cervus
Red deer, C. elaphus 
Sika deer, C. nippon  introduced
Subfamily: Capreolinae
Genus: Capreolus
Roe deer, C. capreolus 
Family: Suidae (pigs)
Subfamily: Suinae
Genus: Sus
Wild boar, S. scrofa

Order: Carnivora (carnivorans) 

There are over 260 species of carnivorans, the majority of which feed primarily on meat. They have a characteristic skull shape and dentition. 
Suborder: Feliformia
Family: Felidae (cats)
Subfamily: Felinae
Genus: Felis
 Jungle cat, F. chaus 
African wildcat, F. lybica 
Genus: Lynx
Eurasian lynx, L. lynx 
 Caucasian lynx, L. l. dinniki
Genus: Otocolobus
 Pallas's cat, O. manul  possibly extirpated
Subfamily: Pantherinae
Genus: Panthera
Leopard, P. pardus 
 Persian leopard, P. p. tulliana 
Family: Hyaenidae (hyaenas)
Genus: Hyaena
 Striped hyena, H. hyaena 
Suborder: Caniformia
Family: Canidae (dogs, foxes)
Genus: Canis
Golden jackal, C. aureus 
European jackal, C. a. moreoticus
Gray wolf, C. lupus 
 Steppe wolf, C. l. campestris
Genus: Vulpes
Red fox, V. vulpes 
Family: Ursidae (bears)
Genus: Ursus
Brown bear, U. arctos 
Eurasian brown bear, U. a. arctos
Family: Mustelidae (mustelids)
Genus: Lutra
Eurasian otter, L. lutra 
Genus: Martes
Beech marten, M. foina 
European pine marten, M. martes 
Genus: Meles
Caucasian badger, M. canescens 
Genus: Mustela
Least weasel, M. nivalis 
Genus: Vormela
Marbled polecat, V. peregusna

Order: Chiroptera (bats) 

The bats' most distinguishing feature is that their forelimbs are developed as wings, making them the only mammals capable of flight. Bat species account for about 20% of all mammals.
Family: Vespertilionidae
Subfamily: Myotinae
Genus: Myotis
Geoffroy's bat, M. emarginatus 
Whiskered bat, M. mystacinus 
Natterer's bat, M. nattereri 
Schaub's myotis, M. schaubi 
Subfamily: Vespertilioninae
Genus: Barbastella
Western barbastelle, B. barbastellus 
Genus: Nyctalus
Greater noctule bat, N. lasiopterus 
Lesser noctule, N. leisleri 
Subfamily: Miniopterinae
Genus: Miniopterus
Common bent-wing bat, M. schreibersii 
Family: Rhinolophidae
Subfamily: Rhinolophinae
Genus: Rhinolophus
Blasius's horseshoe bat, R. blasii 
Mediterranean horseshoe bat, R. euryale 
Greater horseshoe bat, R. ferrumequinum 
Lesser horseshoe bat, R. hipposideros 
 Mehely's horseshoe bat, R. mehelyi

Order: Erinaceomorpha (hedgehogs and gymnures) 

The order Erinaceomorpha contains a single family, Erinaceidae, which comprise the hedgehogs and gymnures. The hedgehogs are easily recognised by their spines while gymnures look more like large rats.

Family: Erinaceidae (hedgehogs)
Subfamily: Erinaceinae
Genus: Erinaceus
 Southern white-breasted hedgehog, E. concolor

Order: Lagomorpha (lagomorphs) 

The lagomorphs comprise two families, Leporidae (hares and rabbits), and Ochotonidae (pikas). Though they can resemble rodents, and were classified as a superfamily in that order until the early 20th century, they have since been considered a separate order. They differ from rodents in a number of physical characteristics, such as having four incisors in the upper jaw rather than two.

Family: Leporidae
Genus: Lepus
 European hare, L. europaeus

Order: Rodentia (rodents) 

Rodents make up the largest order of mammals, with over 40% of mammalian species. They have two incisors in the upper and lower jaw which grow continually and must be kept short by gnawing. Most rodents are small though the capybara can weigh up to 45 kg (100 lb).
Suborder: Hystricomorpha
Family: Hystricidae (Old World porcupines)
Genus: Hystrix
 Indian crested porcupine, H. indica 
Suborder: Sciurognathi
Family: Sciuridae (squirrels)
Subfamily: Sciurinae
Tribe: Sciurini
Genus: Sciurus
 Caucasian squirrel, S. anomalus 
Subfamily: Xerinae
Tribe: Marmotini
Genus: Marmota
 Long-tailed marmot, M. caudata 
Genus: Spermophilus
 Asia Minor ground squirrel, Spermophilus xanthoprymnus
Family: Gliridae (dormice)
Subfamily: Glirinae
Genus: Glis
 European edible dormouse, Glis glis
Family: Dipodidae (jerboas)
Subfamily: Allactaginae
Genus: Allactaga
 Small five-toed jerboa, Allactaga elater
Subfamily: Sicistinae
Genus: Sicista
 Armenian birch mouse, S. armenica  
Family: Spalacidae
Subfamily: Spalacinae
Genus: Nannospalax
 Nehring's blind mole-rat, Nannospalax nehringi
Family: Cricetidae
Subfamily: Cricetinae
Genus: Mesocricetus
 Turkish hamster, Mesocricetus brandti
Subfamily: Arvicolinae
Genus: Chionomys
 Snow vole, Chionomys nivalis
Genus: Ellobius
 Transcaucasian mole vole, Ellobius lutescens
Genus: Microtus
 Altai vole, Microtus obscurus
Family: Muridae (mice, rats, voles, gerbils, hamsters, etc.)
Subfamily: Gerbillinae
Genus: Meriones
 Dahl's jird, Meriones dahli 
 Persian jird, Meriones persicus
 Tristram's jird, Meriones tristrami
 Vinogradov's jird, Meriones vinogradovi
Subfamily: Murinae
Genus: Apodemus
 Striped field mouse, Apodemus agrarius
 Yellow-breasted field mouse, Apodemus fulvipectus
 Black Sea field mouse, Apodemus ponticus
 Ural field mouse, Apodemus uralensis
Genus: Micromys
 Eurasian harvest mouse, Micromys minutus
Genus: Rattus
Brown rat, R. norvegicus  introduced

Order: Soricomorpha (shrews, moles, and solenodons) 

The "shrew-forms" are insectivorous mammals. The shrews and solenodons closely resemble mice while the moles are stout-bodied burrowers.
Family: Soricidae (shrews)
Subfamily: Crocidurinae
Genus: Crocidura
 Armenian shrew, C. armenica 
 Gueldenstaedt's shrew, C. gueldenstaedtii 
 Bicolored shrew, C. leucodon 
Lesser white-toothed shrew, C. suaveolens 
Subfamily: Soricinae
Tribe: Nectogalini
Genus: Neomys
 Transcaucasian water shrew, N. teres 
Tribe: Soricini
Genus: Sorex
 Eurasian pygmy shrew, S. minutus 
 Radde's shrew, S. raddei 
 Caucasian pygmy shrew, S. volnuchini

Locally extinct 
The following species are locally extinct in the country:
Cheetah, Acinonyx jubatus
Moose, Alces alces
Onager, Equus hemionus
Goitered gazelle, Gazella subgutturosa
Lion, Panthera leo
Tiger, Panthera tigris

See also
List of chordate orders
Lists of mammals by region
Mammal classification

References

External links

Armenia
Mammals
'
'mammals
Armenia
Armenia